The 2019 Total Spa 24 Hours was the 71st running of the Spa 24 Hours endurance race. It was also the fourth round of the 2019 Blancpain GT Series Endurance Cup and was held on 27 and 28 July at the Circuit de Spa-Francorchamps, Belgium.

The race was won by GPX Racing and drivers Kevin Estre , Michael Christensen and Richard Lietz. The trio's No. 20 Porsche 911 GT3 R finished only by 3.347 of Rowe Racing and their No. 998 Porsche 911 GT3 R driven by Nick Tandy, Frédéric Makowiecki and Patrick Pilet. Third place went to the #4 Mercedes-AMG Team Black Falcon Mercedes-AMG GT3 shared by Maro Engel, Yelmer Buurman and Luca Stolz.

Entry List 
The following drivers attended the 2019 24 Hours of Spa:

Qualifying

Super Pole

These were the 20 fastest cars in qualifying:

Notes
  - Penalised for not leaving pits at the correct time.

Race

Race Result

References 

Spa 24 Hours
Spa
Spa
24